Thomas Wils (born 24 April 1990) is a Belgian professional footballer who plays for Lierse Kempenzonen. He's a defensive midfielder.

Club career
Wils made his debut during the 2009–10 season. He was loaned out to K.V. Turnhout during the 2010–11 season.

References

External links
 

1990 births
Living people
Association football midfielders
Belgian footballers
Belgian expatriate footballers
Lierse S.K. players
Szombathelyi Haladás footballers
Belgian Pro League players
Challenger Pro League players
Nemzeti Bajnokság I players
Expatriate footballers in Hungary
Lierse Kempenzonen players
Sportspeople from Turnhout
Footballers from Antwerp Province